Araku Valley is a hill station in Alluri Sitharama Raju district in the Indian state of Andhra Pradesh, lying 111 km west of Visakhapatnam city. It is a valley in the Eastern Ghats inhabited by different tribes, mainly Araku Tribes.

Geography

The Anantagiri and Sunkarimetta Reserved Forest, which are part of Araku Valley, are rich in biodiversity and are mined for bauxite.
The altitude is about 1300 m above the sea level. The valley spreads around 36 km.

Economy

Coffee was introduced in Eastern Ghats of Andhra Pradesh in 1898 by British in Pamuleru valley in East Godavari district. Subsequently, it spread over to Araku Valley in the early 19th century. After independence, the Andhra Pradesh Forest Department developed coffee plantations in the valley. In 1956, Coffee Board appointed Andhra Pradesh Girijan Cooperative Corporation Limited (GCC) for promoting coffee plantations in the valley through local tribal farmers. In 1985, the plantations were handed to A.P. Forest Development Corporation and GCC promoted Girijan Coop. Plantation Development Corporation (GCPDC) exclusively to develop coffee plantations in tribal areas. All the plantations developed by GCC and GCPDC were handed over to the tribal farmers at two acres per family.
Apiculture farms have been widely spread in Araku, several types of flavoured honey is being made commercially.

Transport

Araku is connected through both rail and road to Visakhapatnam. Araku railway station is located on the Kothavalasa-Kirandul railway line of Visakhapatnam division of the East Coast Railway, on the Indian Railways network.
RTC Buses to Visakhapatnam every half an hour.

In popular culture
Many Telugu films including Happy Days, Katha, Darling, Life Is Beautiful and Parugu, were shot in Araku.

Gallery

References

External links
 ARAKU VALLEY COMPLETE TRAVEL GUIDE

 Araku Valley Pictures of Tribal museum, horticulture nursery, tribal dancing & Borra caves
Katiki Water Falls, Chaparai Water Cascade

Valleys of India
Hill stations in Andhra Pradesh
Tourist attractions in Andhra Pradesh
Landforms of Andhra Pradesh
Uttarandhra
Mandals in Alluri Sitharama Raju district